The PALL 1st Anniversary Show ("Primer Aniversario de PALL" in Spanish) is a scheduled professional wrestling supercard event produced by Mexican professional wrestling promotion International Wrestling Revolution Group (IWRG) alongside its partners in the "Promotores Asociados de Lucha Libre" ("Associated promotions of professional wrestling") group to celebrate the anniversary of the group. The show will take place on December 1, 2019 in Arena Naucalpan, Naucalpan, State of Mexico, Mexico.

For the PALL 1st Anniversary show Demonio Infernal and Fresero Jr. will both risk their hair on the outcome of the main event match. The show will also include a match for the vacant IWRG Intercontinental Tag Team Championship. The fifth match of the night is scheduled to be a rematch between Internacional Pantera and the wrestler who won his mask in 2006, Misterioso Jr.

Production

Background
Several minor Mexican independent circuit professional wrestling promotions joined together late 2018 to form an overall sanctioning body called Promotores Asociados de Lucha Libre ("Promotional Association of Professional Wrestling"; PALL) to act as a unifying organization for wrestling promotions International Wrestling Revolution Group (IWRG), Lucha Memes, Lucha Libre Boom, Promociones NOBA, Pleu Sports, MDA Lucha Libre, Generación XXI, GCC and Tortas Súper Astro. The various companies would collaborate on events, coordinate to make sure they were not holding shows on the same day. For the wrestlers PALL had a fund to help support wrestlers who were injured during a PALL sanctioned show as well as give them support in promoting them across Mexico. The first co-promoted show under the PALL  banner took place on August 31, 2018 in Arena Naucalpan, in Naucalpan, State of Mexico, owned by the IWRG.

Storylines
The show will feature sevenprofessional wrestling matches with different wrestlers involved in pre-existing scripted feuds, plots and storylines. Wrestlers were portrayed as either heels (referred to as rudos in Mexico, those that portray the "bad guys") or faces (técnicos in Mexico, the "good guy" characters) as they followed a series of tension-building events, which culminated in a wrestling match or series of matches.

The seeds for the shows main event was sown on September 16, 2019, when Fresero Jr. and his tag team partner Mr. Iguana defeated Demonio Infernal and Warrior Jr. after which Fresero Jr. made a challenge for Demonio Infernal's IWRG Rey del Ring Championship. Two weeks later Demonio Infernal successfully defended the championship against Fresero Jr. On the October 27 IWRG show Fresero Jr. helped El Hijo de Canis Lupus defend the IWRG Intercontinental Heavyweight Championship]] against Demonio Infernal by interfering in the match. Following the match Demonio Infernal made a Lucha de Apuestas, "hair vs hair" match challenge. Fresero Jr. defeated Demonio Infernal in a Super Libre, no disqualification match, on November 24, followed by accepting the Apuesta challenge.

On March 24, 2019, Aramís and Imposible defeated Heddi Karaoui and Death Metal to win the vacant IWRG Intercontinental Tag Team Championship. The duo defended the championship twice in the subsequent months, defeating Capo del Norte and Capo del Sur on April 10, and then El Hijo de Canis Lupus and Dragón Bane On April 28. When the full show for the PALL 1st Anniversary show was announced, IWRG revealed that Aramís and Imposible were no longer champions, instead six tag teams would wye for the championship:  Los Traumas ( Trauma I and Trauma II), Los Alas (Alas de Oro and Alas de Plata), Los Fulgors (Fulgor I and II), Ave Rex and Toxin and US representatives Bryce Benjamin and Marshe Rockett, better known as Da Soul Touchaz.

In 2006 Internacional Pantera, then known simply as "El Pantera" lost a steel cage match]] to Misterioso Jr., which also included El Sagrado, Volador Jr., Nitro, Neutron, Mascara Purpura, Averno, Mephisto, El Felino, Sangre Azteca, La Máscara. As a result of the Lucha de Apuestas, or "bet match" stipulation Pantera was forced to unmask. After unmasking he revealed his real name, Francisco Javier Pozas, as part of the Lucha Libre tradition. Pantera later left CMLL and began to wear his mask again, claiming that CMLL had not paid for the mask loss, thus he did not honor the stipulation of the match and resumed wrestling with the mask on.

Results

References

External links 
 

2019 in professional wrestling
2019 in Mexico
IWRG Luchas de Apuestas
December 2019 events in Mexico